Halvari is a Finnish surname. Notable people with the surname include:

Mika Halvari (born 1970), Finnish shot putter
Mikko Halvari (born 1983), Finnish decathlete

Finnish-language surnames